Eric Wallace (1938–2004), British reporter, presenter, and film director.

Eric Wallace may refer to:

Eric Wallace (comics), Final Crisis: Ink, Teen Titans, and Mr. Terrific comic book writer
Eric Wallace, writer of The Wicked and the Dead
Eric Wallace (musician) in Black Breath (band)
Eric Wallace, fictional character in The Closer played by Kyle Gallner
Eric Wallace, showrunner of The Flash